Kayla Banwarth (born January 21, 1989) is an American former volleyball player and coach. She played as a libero for the United States women's national volleyball team. Banwarth won gold with the national team at the 2014 World Championship, and bronze at the 2015 World Cup and 2016 Rio Olympic Games.

Early life
Banwarth was born in Dubuque, Iowa and attended high school at Wahlert Catholic High School. Her team won three state titles and Banwarth graduated with 1,155 kills, 1,093 digs, and 364 aces. She also set school records for digs and aces. Banwarth was named the Iowa Gatorade Player of the Year in 2006.

Career
She played college volleyball at University of Nebraska.

Banwarth was part of the USA national team that won the 2014 World Championship gold medal when the team defeated China 3–1 in the final match. 
 Banwarth retired after the 2016 Rio Olympics and took on a coaching role at her former college, the University of Nebraska, helping the women's volleyball team. She then went on to become the head coach for the Ole Miss starting in the fall of 2020. After a 1-19 COVID-19 shortened first year, in her second season she led the team to their first NCAA tournament appearance in 11 years and their first 20-win (21-9) season in 8 years. In the middle of the 2022 season, Banwarth was placed on leave and eventually she and the university mutually agreed to part ways.

Awards

Individual
 2015 NORCECA Championship "Best Receiver"

National team
 2011  Pan-American Volleyball Cup 		
 2012  Pan-American Volleyball Cup 		
 2013  Pan-American Volleyball Cup 	
 2013  NORCECA Championship 	
 2013  FIVB World Grand Champions Cup	
 2014  FIVB World Championship 	
 2015  FIVB World Grand Prix	
 2015  FIVB Women's World Cup
 2015  Women's NORCECA Volleyball Continental Championship
 2016  Women's NORCECA Olympic Qualification Tournament
 2016  FIVB World Grand Prix
 2016  Summer Olympics

Head coaching record

*Suspended October 20, 2022 and mutually parted ways on October 27, 2022.

References

External links
Ole Miss Rebels Coaching bio
 
 

1989 births
Living people
American women's volleyball players
American volleyball coaches
Nebraska Cornhuskers women's volleyball players
Pepperdine Waves men's volleyball coaches
Nebraska Cornhuskers women's volleyball coaches
Ole Miss Rebels women's volleyball coaches
Sportspeople from Dubuque, Iowa
Volleyball players at the 2011 Pan American Games
Pan American Games bronze medalists for the United States
Liberos
Olympic bronze medalists for the United States in volleyball
Volleyball players at the 2016 Summer Olympics
Medalists at the 2016 Summer Olympics
Pan American Games medalists in volleyball
Medalists at the 2011 Pan American Games